Operation Quickstep was the name given to the deployment of military resources by the Australian Defence Force during the leadup to the 2006 Fijian coup d'état on 4–5 December 2006, during which the Fijian military took control of the Fijian government which, at the time, was led by Prime Minister Laisenia Qarase. The intention behind deploying the military resources was to provide a platform for the evacuation of Australian citizens and nationals in the event of a violent military takeover of the Pacific nation.

Three ships of the Royal Australian Navy were deployed to the South-west Pacific, taking up station in international waters near Fiji, while several military transport aircraft were kept on standby.

Timeline
Following tensions in Fiji between the military and the government throughout 2005–2006, the Australian Government dispatched three naval vessels to international waters off Fiji, in preparation for a potential evacuation of Australians. HMAS Newcastle was the first ship to arrive on station, having departed Sydney on 1 November. HMAS Kanimbla departed two days later, after taking on additional equipment and personnel. HMAS Success joined the two ships later, arriving on or before 24 November.

Nine of the ten crewmembers were rescued, with one, the pilot Captain Mark Bingley, dying from injuries. The tenth crewmember, J. N. N. Porter, was lost and declared dead several days later.

The predicted coup d'état was carried out with minimal violence and no bloodshed on 4–5 December 2006, with government officials placed under house arrest and Fiji's parliament dissolved.

The forces committed to the possible evacuation returned to Australia on 17 December. The feared violence had not occurred, and civilian flights to Fiji continued without disruption during the takeover. The need for a military-backed evacuation force was not evident at that point in time.

Military units involved

Approximately 800 personnel were mobilised as part of the operation, primarily from the Royal Australian Navy, Australian Army and Royal Australian Air Force.

RAN
 HMAS Newcastle carrying:
A Seahawk Helicopter
 HMAS Kanimbla carrying:
 A Commando Contingent
 A Special Air Service Regiment (SASR) contingent
Evacuation handling teams
Approximately 50 additional medical staff, largely from 1 HSB, providing a level 3 surgical capability
A Sea King Helicopter.
HMAS Success

Army
Four Blackhawk helicopters
 Commando contingent
 SASR contingent
 Medical team from 1 HSB
 Amphibious Beach Team (ABT) from the 10th Force Support Battalion

RAAF
 Single AP-3C Orion, based at Pago Pago, American Samoa
 Multiple C-130 Hercules and Boeing 707s, based around Sydney, Australia

References

Further reading
 

Quickstep
2006 in military history
Australia–Fiji relations